Ölmstads IS is a Swedish football club located in Ölmstad.

Background
Ölmstads IS currently plays in Division 5 Småland nordvästra which is the seventh tier of  Swedish football.   They play their home matches at ÖIS Gården in Ölmstad.

The club is affiliated to Smålands Fotbollförbund.

Footnotes

External links
 Ölmstads IS – Official website

Football clubs in Jönköping County